Porno for Pyros is an American alternative rock band formed in Los Angeles, California in 1992, following the break-up of Jane's Addiction. The band currently consists of former Jane's Addiction members Perry Farrell (vocals) and Stephen Perkins (drums), alongside founding members Peter DiStefano (guitar) and Martyn LeNoble (bass). Bass guitarist Mike Watt was a member of the band from 1995 until 1998, and again for one-off appearances in 2020 and 2022.

The band released two studio albums, Porno for Pyros (1993) and Good God's Urge (1996), before going on hiatus in 1998. In 2009, the original line-up reunited for a one-off appearance at frontman Perry Farrell's 50th birthday party. In 2020, the Watt-era line-up of the band reunited for Lolla2020, a free YouTube broadcast event taking place amidst global COVID-19 lockdowns. Following the appearance, members of the group continued to work on new material together, and in 2022, Farrell and Perkins reunited Porno for Pyros for their first large-scale public performances in over twenty-four years, leading to a full reunion of the band's original line-up.

History

1992–1994: Formation and Porno for Pyros
Following the demise of the critically and commercially successful Jane's Addiction, frontman Perry Farrell and drummer Stephen Perkins formed Porno for Pyros after acquiring guitarist Peter DiStefano and bass player Martyn LeNoble. Farrell named the band after seeing an ad for fireworks in a pornographic magazine. The name has also been connected through song lyrics to the LA riots which occurred in the band's hometown around the time of Porno for Pyros' inception.  Prior to releasing their eponymous first album, Porno for Pyros embarked on a nationwide tour to support the new band. By the time the band's debut album was released in 1993, anticipation surrounding the project was enough to briefly drive the album to the No. 3 position on the Billboard top 200 list. The video for the album's second single, "Pets", received heavy airplay on MTV. Following the album's release, Porno for Pyros continued a heavy touring schedule, including an appearance at Woodstock '94 along with a cameo on HBO's The Larry Sanders Show. Unlike the relatively straight-ahead rock shows that were the hallmark of live Jane's Addiction, Porno for Pyros live shows relied heavily on props, extras and special effects (including pyrotechnics).

1995–1998: Good God's Urge and break-up
For the band's follow-up album, Good God's Urge, bass player LeNoble quit after completing the majority of the bass tracks. Ex-Minutemen bassist Mike Watt was brought in to finish up the album tracks and join the band on tour. The album also featured the post-Jane's reunion of Farrell with guitarist Dave Navarro, who made a guest appearance on "Freeway", along with Red Hot Chili Peppers' bass player Flea. The band again set forth on a heavy touring schedule with Watt on bass, then with Flea on bass with Perkins and Farrell's former Jane's Addiction bandmate Dave Navarro on guitar. In reality, the end of Porno For Pyros bled into the "relapsed Jane's Addiction" situation, as Jane's guitarist Dave Navarro and his Red Hot Chili Pepper bandmate Flea guested on 2 songs from the Good God's Urge sessions, "Freeway" and "Hard Charger."  As "Hard Charger" was released and charted as a single from the Howard Stern Private Parts movie, the final touring dates for Porno For Pyros featured 3/4 of Jane's Addiction Dave Navarro and Flea onstage with Peter DeStefano and touring members Sunny Reinhart and Thomas "TJ" Johnson. On several tour stops Porno for Pyros played "Mountain Song", a popular Jane's Addiction tune, a foreshadowing of the later Jane's Addiction reunion efforts. Further touring by the band was scuttled when DiStefano was diagnosed with cancer.

Perkins and Watt subsequently formed the jazz-punk improvisation group Banyan and, along with DiStefano, occasionally perform sets of Stooges cover versions in the Los Angeles area under the band name Hellride.

2009–2019: One-off reunion and rumours
In April 2009, the original lineup of Farrell, Perkins, DiStefano, and LeNoble performed at Farrell's 50th birthday party. In April 2011, Farrell wrote on his Twitter account: "One day, more Porno For Pyros", suggesting that the band would reunite in the future. On September 3, 2012, DiStefano stated that the band would be active in 2013, which was later also announced by Farrell on his Facebook page on July 6, 2013. In 2018, the band were rumoured to be part of an immersive entertainment experience in Las Vegas, named Kind Heaven, created by Farrell, which never came to fruition.

2020–present: Full reunion
On July 27, 2020, it was announced that for the first time in 22 years, Porno for Pyros (featuring the lineup of Perry Farrell, Stephen Perkins, Mike Watt and Peter DiStefano) would be reuniting to play Lolla2020, a free four-night YouTube broadcast event taking place on the original dates of the 2020 Chicago-based Lollapalooza festival, Thursday, July 30 through Sunday, August 2.

On July 20, 2021, DiStefano announced on his Facebook page that he, Farrell and Perkins were working on what will be new material from Porno for Pyros in over two decades.

On May 18, 2022, Farrell shared Jane’s Addiction will not be playing Welcome to Rockville concert in Daytona Beach, Florida, on May 22 due to guitarist Dave Navarro suffering from a “long bout” of COVID-19, but is reuniting his band Porno for Pyros for the performance. “The gang and the government are no different. That makes me 1%. Rockville, although we are blue that Jane’s cannot be with you at this time due to Dave’s long bout with COVID, I am still coming to Daytona, bringing to you for the first time in 26 years Porno For Pyros Featuring myself, Perry Farrrell, Stephen Perkins, Peter DiStefeno and Mike Watt. We’ll play some Jane’s songs for you as well, but for now let’s recall: My boat’s capsized it’s gonna sink to the bottom. I can see the lights on the shore…” noted Farrell on the Welcome to Rockville Facebook page. Drummer Stephen Perkins was replaced by his drum tech Mike Cryciuk for the performance due to a stomach virus, with Nick Maybury, formerly of Scott Weiland & the Wildabouts on additional guitar.

For the band's subsequent summer shows and appearance at Lollapalooza, founding bassist Martyn LeNoble rejoined the band. The band has since confirmed on Instagram that they are working on new material.

Members
Current members
Perry Farrell – vocals, harmonica, tambourine (1992–1998, 2009, 2020, 2022–present)
Stephen Perkins – drums, percussion, backing vocals (1992–1998, 2009, 2020, 2022–present)
Peter DiStefano – guitar, backing vocals (1992–1998, 2009, 2020, 2022–present)
Martyn LeNoble – bass, backing vocals (1992–1996, 2009, 2022–present)

Former members
Mike Watt – bass, backing vocals (1995–1998, 2020, 2022)

Discography

Studio albums

Compilation albums
Rhino Hi-Five : Porno for Pyros (2007)

Singles
 "Tahitian Moon" (Single with two additional unreleased tracks)
 "Sadness" (Single with four additional unreleased tracks)

Charting singles

Music videos

References
Notes

Bibliography
Browne, David. "Burning Addiction", Entertainment Weekly, May 7, 1993. Accessed April 27, 2008.
Farley, Christopher. "Playing with Fire",  Time, May 31, 1993. Accessed April 27, 2008.

External links
 
 janesaddiction.org

Alternative rock groups from California
Musical groups established in 1992
Musical groups disestablished in 1998
Musical groups reestablished in 2018
Musical groups from Los Angeles
Warner Records artists
Musical quartets